Abhishek Chaurasia (born 7 March 1991) is an Indian cricketer. He made his List A debut for Vidarbha in the 2016–17 Vijay Hazare Trophy on 26 February 2017.

References

External links
 

1991 births
Living people
Indian cricketers
Vidarbha cricketers
Place of birth missing (living people)